Bulbophyllum echinolabium (hedgehog-shaped lip bulbophyllum) is a species of orchid.

References

echinolabium